Tunisia women's national basketball team, nicknamed Les Aigles de Carthage (The Eagles of Carthage or The Carthage Eagles), is the nationally controlled basketball team representing Tunisia at world basketball competitions for women. It is administered by the Tunisia Basketball Federation (FTBB).

In 2007, they were the third highest ranked African team in the world after Senegal and Nigeria.

Tournament record

Summer Olympics

World Championship

AfroBasket
 Champions   Runners-up   Third place   Fourth place

Red border color indicates tournament was held on home soil.

African Games

Arab Championship

Pan Arab Games

Mediterranean Games

Jeux de la Francophonie

Current roster
Roster for the 2021 Women's Afrobasket.

See also
Tunisia women's national under-20 basketball team
Tunisia women's national under-19 basketball team
Tunisia women's national under-17 basketball team
Tunisia women's national 3x3 team

References

External links

FIBA profile
Archived records of Tunisia team participations

Women's national basketball teams
Basketball in Tunisia
Basketball teams in Tunisia
National sports teams of Tunisia
1956 establishments in Tunisia